The Deutsche Jungenschaft vom 1.11.1929, abbreviated dj.1.11, was a youth group within the German Youth Movement.

History
The group was founded within the Scouting movement by Eberhard Köbel on 1 November 1929. It demerged from the Deutsche Freischar after disagreements of the organisation's course.

Influence

The dj.1.11 group had significant impact on the German youth movement and on German Scouting.

Deutsche Jungenschaft influenced members of the resistance group, The White Rose in Nazi Germany, which called for active opposition to German dictator Adolf Hitler's regime.

The archetypical tent of German Scouting, the Kohte, was developed within the dj.1.11.

Sports
In 1955 the Evangelische Jungenschaft, running on YMCA in Württemberg, found in Indiaca an ideal sport. The ball can not run away in the mountains.

References

1929 establishments in Germany
German Youth Movement
Scouting and Guiding in Germany
Youth organizations established in 1929